Barbara Fitzgerald Harvey  (born 1928) is a British medieval historian.

She was the joint winner of the Wolfson History Prize in 1993 for her book Living and Dying in England 1100–1540: The Monastic Experience, which examines the lives of monks at Westminster Abbey, one of England's greatest medieval monasteries. Since 1993 she has been emeritus fellow of Somerville College, Oxford. In 1982 she was elected a Fellow of the British Academy.

References

External links

1928 births
Living people
British medievalists
Women medievalists
Commanders of the Order of the British Empire
Fellows of Somerville College, Oxford
Fellows of the British Academy
Place of birth missing (living people)
British women historians
20th-century British historians
20th-century British women writers
21st-century British historians
21st-century British women writers